The Nutri-Score, also known as the 5-Colour Nutrition label or 5-CNL, is a five-colour nutrition label and nutritional rating system, and an attempt to simplify the nutritional rating system demonstrating the overall nutritional value of food products. It assigns products a rating letter from A (best) to E (worst), with associated colors from green to red.

This system was selected by the French government in March 2017 to be displayed on food products after it was compared against several labels proposed by industry or retailers. The system relies on the computation of a nutrient profiling system derived from the United Kingdom Food Standards Agency nutrient profiling system (FSA score). It was created by Santé Publique France, the French public health agency, based on the work of Serge Hercberg from Sorbonne Paris North University. Other bodies involved in the development of the system included the Agency for Food, Environmental and Occupational Health and Safety (ANSES) and the High Council for Public Health (HCSP).

The system has been recommended by other European Union countries as well as the European Commission and the World Health Organization. 
Due to the system's methodology, its implementation for general use is controversial in some EU countries.

Calculation 
The calculation process is based on a concept proposed in 2005 by Professor Mike Rayner and consists of three steps. In the first step, the nutritional score of the food product is assessed. The next step is the determination of Rayner's score which has four different variants:
 main algorithm for most types of food products,
 cheese,
 added fats (fats that are meant as ingredients, i.e. vegetable and animal fats and oils),
 beverages.
The two scores are then used to classify the food product on the five-level Nutri-Score scale.

total N score - total P score = Nutritional score

Product ingredients negatively (N) affecting the Nutri-Score

 high energy density per 100 g or per 100 ml,
 high sugar content,
 high content of saturated fatty acids,
 high salt content.

Product ingredients positively (P) affecting the Nutri-Score

 content of fruits, vegetables, nuts and legumes
 fiber content,
 protein content,
 content rapeseed, walnut and olive oil.

On the basis of its calculation algorithm, the system awards 0 to 10 points for energy value and ingredients that should be limited in the diet, i.e.: saturated fatty acids, sugar and salt; and 0 to 5 points for beneficial ingredients whose consumption should be promoted. These are: fiber, protein, fruits, vegetables, legumes, nuts, and rapeseed oil. To determine the value of the label of a given product, i.e. the letter A, B, C, D or E, the sum of points awarded for the beneficial ingredients must be subtracted from the sum of points awarded for the unwelcome ingredients. The product is classified in one of five value classes (A to E) based on the final score, which may vary from -15 to +40. The lower the score, the better the nutritional value of the product.

A Nutri-Score for a particular food item is given in one of five classification letters, with 'A' being a preferable score and 'E' being a detrimental score. The calculation of the score involves seven different parameters of nutrient information per 100g of food which are usually available on food packagings.

High content of fruits and vegetables, fibers, protein and healthy oils (rapeseed, walnut and olive oils, rule added in 2019) promote a preferable score, while high content of energy, sugar, saturated fatty acids, and sodium promote a detrimental score. In addition to the general calculation rules applied to most types of food, there are special rules for cheese, for “added fats” (fats that are meant as ingredients, such as vegetable oils or butter), and for beverages. For these categories, the score is calculated in a slightly different way. More specifically, in the classic calculation model, the protein content is taken into account or not - depending on the total score calculated for the negative ingredients. For cheese, the protein content is taken into account at all times, irrespective of the total detrimental score. As far as fats are concerned, the ratio of saturated fatty acids to total fat content is taken into account. The algorithm is indifferent to the degree of food processing or such ingredients as vitamins, bioactive substances (antioxidants etc.), fiber type, or food additives.

While Nutri-Score is not used with foods not covered by the mandatory nutrition declaration (listed in Annex V of EP and Council Regulation (EU) No 1169/2011), it is important to note that the system's methodology actually devalues those foods.

In 2022, the update report from the Scientific Committee of the Nutri-Score recommends the following changes for the algorithm:

Goal 
The key assumption behind the system is that the Nutri-Score colour label is always displayed on the front of packaging. Its goal is to allow consumers to compare the overall nutritional value of food products from the same group (category), including food products from different manufacturers. The underlying intention was to help consumers quickly make an informed choice from among similarly packaged products by differentiating those that should be consumed in greater quantities from those that should be consumed in moderation (in smaller quantities or less often).

Adoption of the Nutri-Score 

EU laws do not allow countries to unilaterally impose their own food labelling system, therefore they can only give recommendations.

Currently, the Nutri-Score system is applied on a voluntary basis in European Union countries such as:

 France (despite opposition from farmers and the food industry who tried to stall or delay the decision, the system was eventually adopted by the French Ministry of Health in early 2017.),
 Belgium (formally since 2 April 2019),
 Spain (in November 2018, the Spanish Health Minister María Luisa Carcedo supported voluntary implementation of the Nutri-Score system, but did not introduce any national legislation governing its use).

The Nutri-Score system was adopted for voluntary use and first implemented in France in 2017. Its implementation is supervised by the French Agency for Public Health (Santé Publique France), a body reporting to the French Ministry of Health. In recent years, other countries have also decided to formally accept the system for voluntary use in their domestic markets: Belgium (2018), Switzerland (2019), Germany (2020), Luxembourg (2020) and the Netherlands (2021).

In Portugal, Slovenia and Austria, some food companies such as Nestlé, Auchan or Danone announced that they would use the Nutri-Score although it was not officially recommended by the authorities.

Opposition to Nutri-Score is coming from a coalition of countries including Italy, the Czech Republic, Cyprus, Greece, Hungary, Latvia, and Romania. The Italian government has proposed a competing food label system. Southern EU countries say Nutri-score puts the traditional Mediterranean diet at a disadvantage.

The score is also used by Open Food Facts to allow people to compare the nutritional value of products.

The EU administration works towards the introduction of a common and compulsory front-of-pack nutrition labelling system, and the Nutri-Score system is one of the analyzed solutions.

In their studies, the European Commission and the World Health Organisation point to the need for a transparent, simple and intuitive food labelling system. However, they do not specify which particular food labelling system they recommend. The European Commission believes that front-of-pack nutrition labelling systems can help consumers make informed dietary choices and it seems appropriate to introduce harmonised mandatory front-of-pack nutrition labelling at the EU level. By the end of 2022, the European Commission intends to launch EU-wide public consultation on an EU harmonised and mandatory front-of-pack nutrition labelling. Also WHO is not in a position to recommend any specific labelling scheme. WHO encourages countries and research institutions to further analyze information and collect data to better understand the impact of different front-of-pack labelling systems on consumer behaviour and dietary choices.

Due to the system's controversial methodology and calculation algorithm and incompatibility with the EU Farm to Fork Strategy, the need for a more comprehensive labelling system has been reported.

Comparison of food rating systems 
Prior to the adoption of Nutri-Score in France, a 10-week study was conducted in September 2016, covering 60 supermarkets in 4 French regions. The aim of the study was to compare the efficiency of: Nutri-Score, Nutrimark HSR, UK's Multiple Traffic Light (MTL), SENS, Nutri-Reperes. The algorithms used to calculate the Nutri-Score and SENS scores were validated by ANSES. In addition to the positive findings on the usefulness of Nutri-Score, evidence is also available to demonstrate the usefulness of other food labelling systems. In a large international study covering 12 countries from different parts of the world (a study group of over 12,000 consumers from Bulgaria, Canada, Denmark, France, Germany, Mexico, Singapore, Spain, the UK and the USA) looking at five different traffic light systems, the Multiple Traffic Lights (MTL) system received the highest score. The respondents were asked to rate randomly selected systems in terms of: likeability, trust, understandability, relevance, and obligatory use. Research on improvements in consumer dietary choices owed to the influence of different front-of-pack labelling systems has shown that the efficiency of the MTL and Nutri-Score is similar. Conversely, a study of Italian consumers (a group of 1000+ respondents) showed that none of the five labelling systems tested, including Nutri-Score, was significantly better at changing their food choices, though Nutri-Score led to the correct rankings more often than other systems.

Efficacy studies 
Most food rating systems lack scientific support from studies in real supermarkets. One meta-analysis  concluded that "findings on the efficacy of front-of-pack nutrition labels in ‘nudging’ consumers toward healthier food purchases remain mixed and inconclusive". In this meta-analysis Nutri-Score was not taken into account, because no real supermarket study existed. In December 2021 the only study of the efficacy of Nutri-Score in a supermarket was published. In this study the Nutri-Score was printed on electronic shelve labels and not on the products in a colour-code. The authors concluded that "the impact of ESL (Electronic Shelf-edge Labeling) on consumer purchases was mixed...Shelf labeling on its own is unlikely to significantly influence consumer behaviours." Thus far, no study of the application of the effect of the application of a full-coloured Nutri-Score on food labels in a whole supermarket assortment exists, so the efficacy of Nutri-Score in a realistic supermarket setting is unknown.

Researchers from Göttingen University found that the use of Nutri-Score could prevent products from appearing healthier than they really are.

Concerns regarding the implementation of Nutri-Score 
Some criticize that due to its methodological limitations, the system may promote highly processed foods of low nutritional value, while devaluing natural, organic and regional products. The system is not intended as a tool for comparing the nutritional value of products from different categories. If consumers are not aware of this, information placed on product packaging may be misinterpreted. Polish experts on nutrition and dietetics stated in a nationwide report that the system may mislead consumers, as it may promote ultra-processed products to the detriment of natural or low-processed foods. The system also does not guarantee that the consumer's choice of only products with the highest rating will allow him to compose a balanced diet - this was stated by 80% of the surveyed experts.

The Italian antitrust authority (AGCM, Autorita' Garante della Concorrenza e del Mercato) has reported opening five investigations related to the use of Nutri-Score labels on the front of packaging by GS, Carrefour Italia, Pescanova Italia, Valsoia, as well as by the French companies Regime Dukan, Diet Lab, the English company Weetabix and a German confectionery company.

The AGCM also opened proceedings against the French owner of a smartphone app called Yuka. Yuka is intended to help users assess the nutritional value of products based on the Nutri-Score system. The app presents alternatives to D or E rated foods. AGCM's key concern is that in the absence of appropriate warnings, the Nutri-Score label and the scores and ratings presented in the app are misperceived as absolute health ratings for a given product, without addressing an individual's overall needs (diet and lifestyle), amount and frequency of consumption as part of a varied and balanced diet. Consequently, consumers may be more prone to associate health characteristics with products with a high Nutri-Score or Yuka rating, and thus to unreasonably attribute health effects to the choices made on that basis. Specifically, AGCM pointed out to the attribution of positive health properties to products labelled with the highest Nutri-Score.

See also 

 Food labelling and advertising law (Chile)

References

External links 

 Official website at Santé Publique France
 Development of a new front-of-pack nutrition label in France: the five-colour Nutri-Score, article in the WHO's Public Health Panorama (vol. 3, issue 4) which describes the Nutri-Score in detail

Food labelling
Rating systems